John Baron D.D. (died 20 January 1722) was an English academic administrator at the University of Oxford.

Baron was elected Master (head) of Balliol College, Oxford on 20 January 1705, a post he held until his death in 1722.
During his time as Master of Balliol, he was also Vice-Chancellor of Oxford University from 1715 until 1718.

References

Year of birth missing
1722 deaths
Masters of Balliol College, Oxford
Vice-Chancellors of the University of Oxford